John Shackelford may refer to

John Williams Shackelford (1844–1883), U.S. congressman from North Carolina
John Shackelford (baseball) (1905–1964), Negro league baseball player

See also
Shackelford (disambiguation)